Schloss Wolfsgarten is a former hunting seat of the ruling family of Hesse-Darmstadt, located in the German state of Hessen, approximately 15 kilometers south of Frankfurt am Main.  The hunting lodge was established between 1722 and 1724 by Landgrave Ernst Ludwig of Hesse-Darmstadt.  Ernst Ludwig's purpose in establishing Wolfsgarten was to pursue his passion for hunting with dogs which he introduced into Hesse in 1709.  The original building corresponded to the usual pattern for hunting seats of that era with a rectangular yard around which was grouped housing for gentlemen, the stables for the horses, and kennels for the dogs.  After Ernst Ludwig's successors abandoned hunting with dogs in 1768, Wolfsgarten was abandoned until the 1830s when the grand ducal family began to restore and expand the property.  From 1879, Wolfsgarten became a favorite country retreat for Grand Dukes Ludwig IV and his son Ernst Ludwig.

In the twentieth century, Grand Duke Ernst Ludwig extensively modernized Schloss Wolfsgarten and rearranged its park. After the abolition of the monarchy in 1918, Wolfsgarten became the principal residence of the former grand ducal family. It served as home to Louis, Prince of Hesse and by Rhine until his death in 1968 and then to his widow, Princess Margaret, née Geddes (1913–1997), a close friend of Queen Elizabeth II. Following her death it was occupied by Moritz, Landgrave of Hesse and since 2013 by his eldest son, Donatus, Landgrave of Hesse.

Schloss Wolfsgarten is the property of the Hessian House Foundation (Hessische Hausstiftung), the family trust that holds ownership to the property belonging to all branches of the House of Hesse. The property is open to the public only on two weekends in May during the annual Rhododendrenblüte (Rhododendron festival) and again for a weekend in September for the Schloss Wolfsgarten Garden Festival.

References

Wolfsgarten
Hunting lodges in Germany